Hjelmelandsvågen is the administrative centre of Hjelmeland municipality, Norway. The village is located on the south side of the mouth of the Jøsenfjorden.

The Norwegian National Road 13 runs through the village, with a ferry connection across the Jøsenfjorden and to the nearby island of Ombo. Hjelmeland Church is located in the village.

References

Villages in Rogaland
Hjelmeland